Mühlburg, formerly a town on its own right, is a borough located in the west of Karlsruhe, Baden-Württemberg, Germany.
The name Mühlburg could be translated as 'Mill Castle' and refers to a water mill and a water castle located at the site where a Roman road once crossed the small river Alb.

History
Mühlburg was first mentioned in 1248, when it was referred to as Mulenberc.  In 1258 there was the first mention of a castle owned by Rudolf I, Margrave of Baden.
In 1274 Mühlburg was, like many neighbouring settlements, occupied by Rudolph of Habsburg.

In 1670 Mühlburg received town privileges and, just a few years before Karlsruhe, it was issued a "letter of freedom", which relaxed the requirements for craftsmen and new citizens to settle in the town.

It is believed that the Margraves of Baden planned to expand Mühlburg. Any such plans came to a halt in 1689, when Mühlburg and its castle were destroyed by French troops during the Nine Years' War following the orders of Louis XIV of France to destroy the margravate of Baden ("Ruinez les pays de Bade").  

The castle was never rebuilt thereafter and the ruins of the castle were used as building material for a newly founded palace nearby, out of which the future city of Karlsruhe would develop.

Mühlburg finally became a borough of Karlsruhe in 1886.

Notable people
Mühlburg is the birthplace of Karl Benz (1844–1929), inventor of the automobile and founder of Benz & Cie.

Sources

References

Karlsruhe
Boroughs of Karlsruhe